USRC Active, was a revenue cutter of the United States Revenue Cutter Service in commission from 1812 to 1817.  She was the second Revenue Cutter Service ship to bear the name.

Acquired in 1812, Active was possibly a chartered vessel. She saw service during the War of 1812.  Commanded by Revenue Captain Caleb Brewster, she was part of a flotilla that was blockaded at New London, Connecticut, by the Royal Navy during the war. Active remained in service until 1817.

Another cutter named USRC Active entered service at Baltimore, Maryland, in 1816, so that for at least one year there were two cutters in service in the Revenue Cutter Service with the same name.

References
United States Coast Guard Historians Office: Active, 1812

Ships of the United States Revenue Cutter Service
War of 1812 ships of the United States
1812 ships